The 2015 Jiffy Lube Alberta Scotties Tournament of Hearts, Alberta's provincial women's curling championship, was held from January 21 to 25 at the Lacombe Arena in Lacombe, Alberta. The winning team Val Sweeting team represented Alberta at the 2015 Scotties Tournament of Hearts in Moose Jaw.

Qualification
Twelve teams qualified for the provincial tournament through several methods. The qualification process is as follows:

Teams
The teams are listed as follows:

Knockout Draw Brackets
The draw is listed as follows:

A event

B event

C event

Knockout results
All draw times listed in Mountain Standard Time (UTC−7).

Draw 1
Wednesday, January 21, 9:30 am

Draw 2
Wednesday, January 21, 6:30 pm

Draw 3
Thursday, January 22, 9:00 am

Draw 4
Thursday, January 22, 2:00 pm

Draw 5
Thursday, January 22, 6:30 pm

Draw 6
Friday, January 23, 9:00 am

Draw 7
Friday, January 23, 2:00 pm

Draw 8
Friday, January 23, 6:30 pm

Draw 9
Saturday, January 24, 1:00 pm

Playoffs

A vs. B
Saturday, January 24, 6:30 pm

C1 vs. C2
Saturday, January 24, 6:30 pm

Semifinal
Sunday, January 25, 9:30 am

Final
Sunday, January 25, 2:00 pm

References

External links

Curling in Alberta
Alberta Scotties Tournament of Hearts
Lacombe, Alberta
Scotties Tournament of Hearts
Alberta Scotties Tournament of Hearts